Johan Schatter (4 October 1594 – 28 June 1673), was a Dutch Golden Age brewer from Haarlem.

Biography
He was born in Haarlem as the son of the malt maker Hercules Schatter and Cornelia Jacobsdr van Os, brewers of De Gecroonde Ruyt, which he took over. Johan became a judge, magistrate, and alderman, and joined the St Adrian militia as captain and served from 1624-1627, 1636-1637, and served as fiscal/provost from 1637-1642. He was portrayed by Frans Hals twice; in his schutterstuk called The Banquet of the Officers of the St Adrian Militia Company in 1627, and again in 1633. He married Volckje, the daughter of Pieter Jacobsz Olycan on 24 April 1616.

He died in Haarlem.

References

Johan Schatter in De Haarlemse Schuttersstukken, by Jhr. Mr. C.C. van Valkenburg, pp. 60, Haerlem : jaarboek 1961, ISSN 0927-0728, on the website of the North Holland Archives

1594 births
1673 deaths
Businesspeople from Haarlem
Frans Hals
Mayors of Haarlem
Dutch brewers